The Higher Institute Of Computer Science & Information Technology  in El Shorouk City is officially licensed by the Ministry of Higher Education and Scientific Research of the Arab Republic of Egypt. The Higher Institute of Computer & Information Technology in El Shorouk was granted its original accreditation according to the decree of the Supreme Council of Universities No. 79 on June 5, 2004.

Academic study

Academic fields
Data analytics
Data warehousing
Data mining
Software engineering
Cloud computing
System analysis
System design
Management information systems
Programming and SE development

Academic degrees
The Higher Institute of Computer Science provide the Egyptian Bachelors in computer science that is equal to the Egyptian Bachelors in computer science provided by Egyptian universities.

Testing centers

Prometic testing center
In March 2008 an agreement between the Institute and Prometric company was signed, these agreement give the institute the right to start his own testing center that provides all Microsoft exams as well as sun and Apple.

ICDL testing center
In January 2010 another agreement between the Institute and UNESCO, was signed, these agreement give the institute the right to start his own testing center that provide the International ICDL and the Egyptian version of ICDL.

Student activities

Microsoft student partners

2011 MSPs

GDG Shorouk
Formerly known as Shorouk GTUG (Google Technology User Group) is the Google Developers Group in shorouk academy, founded in 2011 by the following students of HICIT:

 Ahmed Mahmoud
 Ahmed Farid
 Ashraf Hesham
 Nasser Ali

References

External links
 
 Shorouk GTUG Official Facebook Page
  Meahope Official Facebook Page

Universities in Egypt
Education in Cairo
Educational institutions established in 2004
2004 establishments in Egypt